Manuel de Pando y Fernández de Pinedo, 6th Marquess of Miraflores, 4th Count of la Ventosa, GE (22 December 1792 – 20 February 1872) was a Spanish noble and politician, who served two times as Prime Minister of Spain and held other important political office such as Minister of State and President of the Senate.

Biography
Pando was born Madrid. After studying agriculture and industry, he took part in the Dos de Mayo Uprising during the War of Spanish Independence. Later he had to flee, together with his family, to Cádiz. After the accession to the throne of Ferdinand VII of Spain, the latter's uncle, Infante Antonio Pascual of Spain asked Pando advice for the writing of the Memorial of Miraflores, which aimed to solve the situation after the end of the French domination in Spain.

In 1820, as part of the National Militia, he took part to several actions under general  Rafael Riego; he abandoned the field two years later, however, and was able to escape the persecutions of the so-called Década Ominosa (1823–1833).

Pando reappeared in the public life in 1832, siding for regent Maria Cristina of Spain and the future Isabella II. In 1834 he was named Spanish plenipotentiary at London. As a diplomat, he had a role in the signing of the alliance between Spain, France, Portugal and the United Kingdom. He subsequently returned to Spain where he held several position, until forced to flee to France in the wake of the Revolt of La Granja de San Ildefonso. Returned home, Pardo took part in the declaration of the constitution and in the Convention of Vergara which substantially put an end to the First Carlist War.

On 12 February 1846 he became Minister of State. His moderately progressive program, favouring a return to morality and a general conciliation, was however thwarted by the opposition of his predecessor, general Ramón María Narváez and by the immoral behaviour of regent Maria Cristina. Pardo resigned on 16 March, being replaced by Narváez himself. From 1845 to 1862 he was president of the Spanish Senate. After the marriage of Queen Isabella II and Francis, Duke of Cádiz, Pardo became Governor of the Royal Palace, and worked to reform its administration.

During the presidency of Juan Bravo Murillo, Pardo was Minister of State (minister of Foreign Affairs, 1851–1852). In this role, obtained the help of France and Britain in the defence of Cuba. In 1853 Isabella called him again as prime minister, a position he held until 1864; afterwards he was again President of the Senate from 1866 to 1867.

He died in Madrid, Spain in 1872.

|-
 

|-

|-

|-
 

|-

1792 births
1872 deaths
Politicians from Madrid
Marquesses of Spain
Counts of Spain
Prime Ministers of Spain
Foreign ministers of Spain
Grandees of Spain
Knights of the Golden Fleece
Moderate Party (Spain) politicians
19th-century Spanish politicians
Members of the Senate of Spain
Ambassadors of Spain to France
Nobility from Madrid
Presidents of the Senate of Spain
Ambassadors of Spain to the United Kingdom of Great Britain and Ireland